Charles Moore may refer to:

Arts and entertainment
 Charles Herbert Moore (1840–1930), American artist and historian
 Charles R. Moore (actor) (1893–1947), American actor
 Charles Moore (dancer) (1928–1986), founder of The Charles Moore Dance Theatre
 Charles Moore (photographer) (1931–2010), American photographer who documented the Civil Rights Era

Journalism
 Charles Moore (city planner) (1855–1942), journalist and city planner in Detroit, Michigan
 Charles Moore, Baron Moore of Etchingham (born 1956), British journalist, former editor of The Spectator, The Sunday Telegraph and The Daily Telegraph

Politics
 Charles Moore, 2nd Viscount Moore of Drogheda (1603–1643), Irish aristocrat
 Charles Moore, 1st Earl of Charleville (1712–1764), Irish peer
 Charles Moore, 1st Marquess of Drogheda (1730–1821), British peer and military officer
 Charles Moore, 2nd Marquess of Drogheda (1770–1837), Irish peer
 Charles Moore (English politician) (1771–1826), Member of Parliament 1799–1802, 1802–1806 and 1807–1812
 Charles Moore (Irish MP) (1804–1869), Irish politician, Member of Parliament for Tipperary 1865–1869
 Charles Moore (Australian politician) (1820–1895), New South Wales parliamentarian and Mayor of Sydney
 Charles S. Moore (1857–1915), American politician in Oregon
 Charles C. Moore (1866–1958), Governor of Idaho
 C. Ellis Moore (1884–1941), U.S. Representative from Ohio
 Charles Moore, 11th Earl of Drogheda (1910–1989), British peer
 Charles M. Moore (born 1923/1924), American politician

Science
 Charles B. Moore (1920–2010), American meteorologist and balloonist
 Charles J. Moore, oceanographer, environmentalist and racing yacht captain
 Charles Moore (botanist) (1820–1905), director of the Royal Botanic Gardens, Sydney
 Charles Moore (geologist) (1815–1881), English geologist

Sports
 Charles Moore (hurdler) (1929–2020), American Olympic hurdler
 Chuck Moore (American football) (born 1940), former American football offensive lineman
 Charles W. Moore (American football), American football coach and player

Technology
 Charles H. Moore (born 1938), inventor of the Forth programming language
 Charles R. Moore (computer engineer) (1961–2012), noted for his research on computer architecture

Other
 Charles Leonard Moore (1854–1925), lawyer and poet born in Philadelphia
 Charles Napoleon Moore (1882–1967), American mathematician at Bowling Green State University
 Charles A. Moore (1901–1967), American professor of comparative philosophy
 Charles E. Moore (1894–1953), American industrialist
 Charles R. Moore (minister) (1934–2014), American Methodist minister
 Charles Chilton Moore (1837–1906), American atheist and newspaper editor
 Charles Moore (architect) (1925–1993), American architect
 Charles Page Thomas Moore (1831–1904), joint founder of Phi Kappa Psi fraternity
 Charles W. Moore Jr. (born 1946), U.S. Navy admiral
 Charles Brainard Taylor Moore, U.S. Navy admiral and governor of American Samoa
 Charles Johnes Moore, U.S. Navy admiral
 Charles L. Moore, United States Air Force general
 Charles Moore (diplomat), High Commissioner of the United Kingdom to Namibia
 Charles Moore and Co., Australian department store chain

See also
Charlie Moore (disambiguation)